Piccirillo is an Italian surname. Notable people with the surname include:

Angel Piccirillo (born 1994), American middle-distance runner
Hervé Piccirillo (born 1967), French football referee
Lisa Piccirillo (born 1991), American mathematician
Michele Piccirillo (born 1970), Italian boxer
Michele Piccirillo (archaeologist) (1944–2008), Franciscan priest and expert in Byzantine archaeology
Mike Piccirillo (born 1951), American musician

Italian-language surnames

it:Piccirillo